Alexandre Emmanuel "Sacha" Trudeau (born December 25, 1973) is a Canadian filmmaker, journalist and author of Barbarian Lost. He is the second son of Canada's former prime minister, Pierre Trudeau, and Margaret Trudeau, and the younger brother of Canada's current prime minister, Justin Trudeau.

Early life and education
Alexandre is the younger one of the two Christmas babies of Pierre Trudeau and Margaret Trudeau, exactly two years younger than Justin Trudeau. The family was attending the 1973 Christmas midnight mass at Mount Carmel Roman Catholic Church when Margaret Trudeau went into labour and was rushed to The Ottawa Hospital. His mother struggled with severe postpartum depression after his birth, and was later diagnosed with bipolar disorder. He was given the nickname "Sacha" (the French spelling of the Russian diminutive for Alexander) in recognition of his father's love of Russian literature and culture. The name also is linked to former ambassador of the USSR to Canada and family friend Alexander Yakovlev. Alexandre Trudeau's younger brother, Michel, was born in 1975.  All three of Pierre and Margaret Trudeau's children became media sensations from birth.

When talking about her sons each having distinctly different personalities, in an interview in 1977, Margaret Trudeau said, "Justin, 6, is a prince – a very good little boy. Sacha, born Christmas Day, 1973, is a bit of a revolutionary, very determined and strong willed. Miche (Michel) is a happy, well-adjusted child, who combined the best traits of both brothers."

His parents announced they would separate in 1977. His mother, unbeknownst to the public, then lived in an attic suite within the Prime Minister's official residence at 24 Sussex Drive in Ottawa for the next three years, so as to make the adjustment easier on the children. After the divorce was finalized on April 2, 1984, he and his brothers attended the civil ceremony in which Margaret Trudeau remarried to Ottawa real estate developer Fried Kemper on April 18, 1984. A half-brother, Kyle Kemper (born 1984), and a half-sister, Alicia Kemper (born 1988), soon followed. Pierre and Margaret Trudeau tried as much as possible to protect their children from the public eye, and following Pierre Trudeau's retirement as Prime Minister in 1984, he raised them in relative privacy in Montreal. Alexandre Trudeau gained another half-sister, Sarah Coyne (born 1991), from his father's relationship with Canadian politician Deborah Coyne.

Like his father and brothers, Alexandre Trudeau studied at Collège Jean-de-Brébeuf. He graduated with a B.A. in philosophy and a Masters in architecture from McGill University. While attending McGill, he joined the Canadian Forces as a Reserve Entry Scheme Officer with Royal Canadian Hussars reserve regiment in 1996. He trained at CFB Gagetown, New Brunswick and was commissioned as a Second Lieutenant, but released voluntarily before completing his training as an armoured officer. Following graduation, he traveled to West Africa to produce his first documentary: Liberia, the Secret War (1998). In the same year in which the documentary was made, his brother Michel died in an avalanche that pushed him into British Columbia's Kokanee Lake, where he drowned.

When Pierre Trudeau died in 2000, both his surviving sons returned to the public eye. Although Alexandre Trudeau was visibly more reserved and quieter than his brother, his heightened public profile brought new attention to his work as a journalist. After Pierre Trudeau's death, Alexandre continued to live in his father's Art Deco home (Cormier House) in Montreal.

Work

In the years following his father's death, Trudeau produced documentaries for Canadian television. In 2003, he was one of the highest-profile Canadian journalists covering the 2003 invasion of Iraq, producing a documentary film for the CTV program W5, Embedded In Baghdad. His 2004 film, The Fence, shot in Afula, Israel and Jenin of the Palestinian territories draws up a portrait of families on either side of the Israeli-built security barrier around the West bank.

In June 2005, Trudeau focused attention on what he said were the implications for civil liberties in the Canadian government's use of security certificates to detain indefinitely, without trial, suspected terrorists based on secret evidence. Trudeau offered to be a surety for Hassan Almrei, a Syrian refugee held in a Canadian jail for four years without any charges being laid. His appearance in court in support of Almrei resulted in front-page coverage in the Toronto Star and National Post and major media attention being given to the security certificate issue for the first time. Trudeau's efforts were chronicled in his documentary Secure Freedom. Almrei was ordered released under house arrest by a Federal Court judge on January 2, 2009. On December 14, 2009, Almrei was released.

Known for his staunchly anti-imperialist views, Trudeau attracted controversy in August 2006 for an article he penned praising Fidel Castro's Cuba. Trudeau's documentary Refuge, produced in 2008, tells the story of the humanitarian crisis facing Africa's Darfur region and eastern Chad. In 2012, he produced the film The New Great Game, for the Canadian Broadcasting Corporation about the maritime geopolitics of the Middle-East and Western Indian Ocean.

In 2016, Trudeau published his first book with Harper Collins, Barbarian Lost, Travels in the New China, a number one Canadian best-seller. The book is a travel mémoire with an undercurrent of philosophical and historical reflection. It dresses a personal and nuanced portrait of an ancient country in the throes of massive change. About the book, Trudeau is quoted as saying: "My whole professional career has had a focus on geopolitics, and in this age, you cannot understand the world without understanding the massive role that China has grown to play."

In 2018, Trudeau presented his first scripted work, the short film Wiisgaapte (Bitter Smoke). A product of a collaboration with Dr Shirley Williams, an Ojibwe language specialist, the film’s dialogue is entirely in old Ojibwe dialect and tells the story of the windigo legend of Algonquian lore.

Public life
Currently, Trudeau is President and Chief Producer at Same Adventure Productions. He and wife Zoë Bedos are the parents of a son, Pierre-Emmanuel, and two daughters, Gala Simone and Ariane Lea. He is a founding member of the Pierre Elliott Trudeau Foundation for excellence in social sciences and humanities research and innovation.

References

External links
 Alexandre (Sacha Trudeau) faces the world - The Globe and Mail profile written by Sarah Hampson.
 Alexandre Trudeau Interview on The Hour with George Stroumboulopoulos

 

1973 births
Canadian people of Dutch descent
Canadian people of English descent
Canadian people of French descent
Canadian people of Malaysian descent
Canadian people of Indonesian descent
Canadian people of Scottish descent
Journalists from Ontario
Children of prime ministers of Canada
Film directors from Ottawa
Living people
Pierre Trudeau
McGill University alumni
French Quebecers
Journalists from Montreal
Alexandre
Canadian documentary film directors
Film directors from Montreal
Canadian documentary film producers